No. 278 Squadron may refer to:

No. 278 Squadron RAF, in the United Kingdom
No. 278 Squadron RAAF, in Australia